Fernwood is an unincorporated community in Jefferson County, in the U.S. state of Ohio.

History
A post office called Fernwood was established in 1883, and remained in operation until 1929. Besides the post office, Fernwood had a Methodist Episcopal church.

References

Unincorporated communities in Jefferson County, Ohio
Unincorporated communities in Ohio